Better Together is an album by Gaither Vocal Band. It earned the group a Grammy Award nomination for Best Roots Gospel Album.

Awards and accolades 
On August 9, 2017, it was announced that Better Together would be nominated for a GMA Dove Award in the Southern Gospel Album of the Year  category at the 48th Annual GMA Dove Awards.

References

2016 albums
Gaither Vocal Band albums